Xarma, also Sharma, Xiama or Xiamaxiang is a small town and township-level division of Lhari County in the Nagqu Prefecture of the Tibet Autonomous Region, in China. As of 2004 it had a population of about 1700. 
The principal economic activity is animal husbandry, pastoral yak, goat, sheep, and so on.

Administrative divisions
The township-level division contains the following villages:

Po'ercang Village (坡尔仓村)
Gongxi Village	(贡西村) 	
Langqing Village (朗庆村)
Azhaiku Village (阿寨库村)
Mentangku Village (门塘库村)
Chuiqian Village (垂铅村)
Jiaren Village (甲仁村)
Takong Village	 (塔孔村) 	
Jiagei Village (甲给村) 	
Chuiqiong Village (垂琼村) 	
Duola Village (多拉村) 	
Naicang Village (乃仓村) 
Xiama Village	(夏玛村 )

See also
List of towns and villages in Tibet

References

Township-level divisions of Tibet
Populated places in Nagqu
Lhari County